The 1980 Major League Baseball postseason was the playoff tournament of Major League Baseball for the 1980 season. The winners of each division advance to the postseason and face each other in a League Championship Series to determine the pennant winners that face each other in the World Series. 

For the fourth time in the past six years, the postseason once again featured the New York Yankees, Kansas City Royals, and Philadelphia Phillies. The Houston Astros also made their first postseason appearance in franchise history this year. All four teams would return during the expanded 1981 postseason, as due to the lockout-shortened season, the season was split in half and the division leaders during each half qualified for the postseason.

The playoffs began on October 7, 1980, and concluded on October 21, 1980, with the Phillies defeating the Royals in six games in the 1980 World Series. This was the first championship in franchise history for the Phillies.

Playoff seeds
The following teams qualified for the postseason:

American League
 New York Yankees - 103–59, Clinched AL East
 Kansas City Royals - 97–65, Clinched AL West

National League
 Philadelphia Phillies - 91–71, Clinched NL East
 Houston Astros - 93–70, Clinched NL West

Playoff bracket

American League Championship Series

New York Yankees vs. Kansas City Royals

This was the fourth meeting between these two teams in the ALCS in the past five years. After three previous failed attempts, the Royals finally broke through, sweeping the Yankees to advance to their first World Series in franchise history.

Kansas City ace Larry Gura outdueled Ron Guidry as the Royals blew out the Yankees in Game 1. In Game 2, the Royals jumped out to an early lead and managed to hold it, as they fended off a late rally by the Yankees in the top of the eighth to win by a 3-2 score and go up 2-0 in the series headed to the Bronx. In Game 3, the Yankees held a 2-1 lead after six innings, but couldn't hold it as George Brett hit a three-run home run off Yankees' relief pitcher Goose Gossage, putting the Royals ahead for good. The Royals clinched the pennant with a one-two-three ninth inning, exacting long-awaited revenge on the team that eliminated them from the postseason three consecutive times.

The Royals returned to the ALCS in 1984, but were swept by the eventual World Series champion Detroit Tigers. They would win their next AL pennant in 1985, against the Toronto Blue Jays in seven games.

The Yankees returned to the ALCS the next year, sweeping the Oakland Athletics en route to the World Series. This was the last time the Yankees were swept in the ALCS until 2012.

National League Championship Series

Houston Astros vs. Philadelphia Phillies

This was the first postseason meeting between the Astros and Phillies, as well as the first postseason series ever played in the state of Texas. This edition of the NLCS is remembered as the closest and most grueling playoff series in MLB history. The series went to its five-game limit, with the final four games going into extra innings. The Phillies prevailed after a 10-inning Game 5 to return to the World Series for the first time since 1950.

Game 1 was the only game of the series to not go into extra innings - the Astros held a 1-0 lead going into the bottom of the sixth, until Greg Luzinski hit a two-run home run to put the Phillies ahead for good (Luzinski's home run was the only one of this series).

Game 2 was an offensive duel which went into extra innings - in the top of the tenth, the Astros scored four runs with three hits - an RBI single by José Cruz, a run-scoring groundout by César Cedeño, and a two-run triple by Dave Bergman. The Phillies got an unearned run in the bottom of the inning on an error by Craig Reynolds at shortstop, but Astros reliever Joaquín Andújar came in and held on for the save to tie the series at 1–1 headed to Houston.

Game 3 was the first postseason game played in Texas, and it was a long and grueling pitchers' duel between both teams’ pitching staffs. Houston's Joe Niekro pitched ten shutout innings, but it wasn't enough for him to get the win, which went to Astros relief pitcher Dave Smith. The Astros won 1-0 in the bottom of the eleventh as Denny Walling hit a sacrifice fly to drive in Joe Morgan, and were now one win away from their first ever World Series appearance.

Game 4 went into extra innings yet again, and the Phillies would even the series as Luzinski entered as a pinch-hitter and doubled home Pete Rose with the go-ahead run on a close play at the plate, with Rose running over Astros catcher Bruce Bochy. Manny Trillo then singled home Luzinski with an insurance tally.

Game 5 was the most notable of the series. The Astros held a 5-2 lead after seven innings and were six outs away from clinching the pennant. However, in the top of the eighth, the Phillies loaded the bases with nobody out on three straight singles, including an infield hit by Bob Boone and a bunt single by Greg Gross. Two runs came in on a walk to Rose and a ground-out by Keith Moreland. An RBI single by Del Unser tied the game at 5, and then Trillo put the Phillies ahead with a two-run triple. The Astros tied the game in the bottom of the eighth, with Rafael Landestoy and Cruz each singling in a run. The game went scoreless through the ninth, and went into extra innings for the fourth straight time. In the top of the tenth, the Phillies got doubles from Unser and Garry Maddox in the tenth to take the lead for good. Dick Ruthven retired the Astros in order in the bottom of the tenth the last out being a soft liner to Maddox, clinching the pennant for the Phillies.

The Astros returned to the postseason the next year, but lost to the eventual champion Los Angeles Dodgers in the NLDS. This was the first of three consecutive losses in the NLCS for the Astros - in 1986 they would fall to the New York Mets in six games, and in 2004 they fell to the St. Louis Cardinals in seven games. They would win their first pennant in 2005 over the Cardinals in six games, which would be the only one the team won as a member of the National League. 

The Phillies would win their next NL pennant in 1983, against the Los Angeles Dodgers in four games before falling in the World Series to the Baltimore Orioles.

The Astros and Phillies would meet again 42 years later in the 2022 World Series which the Astros, now members of the American League, won in six games.

1980 World Series

Kansas City Royals (AL) vs. Philadelphia Phillies (NL) 

This was the first edition of the World Series since 1920 to feature two teams that had not won a World Series title before. The Phillies defeated the Royals in six games to win their first World Series title in franchise history.

Game 1 was an offensive duel which the Phillies won 7-6 - it marked the first time that the Phillies won a World Series game since Game 1 of the 1915 World Series against the Boston Red Sox. The Phillies rallied late to take Game 2 after scoring four unanswered runs in the bottom of the eighth to take a 2-0 series lead headed to Kansas City. The Royals got on the board in Game 3, as Willie Aikens drove in Willie Wilson with an RBI single in the bottom of the tenth. In Game 4, the Royals jumped out to an early 5-1 lead and did not relinquish it, as closer Dan Quisenberry held off a potential rally by the Phillies to even the series at two. In Game 5, the Royals held a 3-2 lead after eight innings, but the Phillies managed to come back. Del Unser drove in Mike Schmidt with an RBI double to tie the game, and then Manny Trillo drove in the go-ahead run with a line shot that ricocheted off Quisenberry for an infield hit, which was almost thrown out by George Brett. Phillies' closer Tug McGraw held the Royals' offense at bay in the bottom of the ninth, giving the Phillies a 3-2 lead headed back home. The Phillies clinched the title in Game 6, as they jumped out to an early lead and did not relinquish it, winning 4-1 to secure their first title in franchise history. 

The Phillies became the last of the "Original Sixteen" franchises to win a World Series title (although the St. Louis Browns never won a Series in St. Louis, waiting until , twelve years after becoming the Baltimore Orioles). It was the first time the city of Philadelphia won a World Series since the Athletics did so in 1930, as well as the second straight World Series title won by a team from Pennsylvania after the Pittsburgh Pirates did so the previous year. 

The Phillies would return to the postseason the next year, but fell to the Montreal Expos in the NLDS in five games. They would return to the World Series in 1983 and 1993, but they would lose both to the Baltimore Orioles and the Toronto Blue Jays respectively. The next title for the Phillies would come in 2008, where they defeated the Tampa Bay Rays in five games.

The Royals also returned to the postseason the next year, but were swept by the Oakland Athletics in the ALDS. They would not taste championship success until 1985, where they defeated their fellow Missouri rival in the St. Louis Cardinals in seven games.

References

External links
 League Baseball Standings & Expanded Standings - 1980

 
Major League Baseball postseason